Lichtenfels station is in the town of Lichtenfels in Upper Franconia in the German state of Bavaria. It is a regional rail hub and a former ICE stop on the Hamburg–Berlin Munich route and is classified by Deutsche Bahn as a station of category 3.

Location 
Lichtenfels station is 31.9 km from Bamberg on the Bamberg–Hof railway and 150.9 from Eisenach on the Werra Railway at a height of 262.4 metres above sea level and is located west of the town centre and east of the Main river.

History

Planning of the Bamberg–Lichtenfels section of the Ludwig South-North Railway began in the summer of 1841, and work started shortly later. The line had to penetrate the town's wall, which had to be rebuilt with a new Coburger Tor ("Coburg gate") over the line. The station, together with a depot, was first connected to the line in January 1846. The official opening ceremony followed on 15 February 1846. On 15 October 1846 the line was extended to Neuenmarkt and on 1 November 1848 the line reached its terminus in Hof. The first massive entrance building was a temporary wooden structure built between 1847 and 1850. In January 1859 the Werra Railway was extended to Lichtenfels, making the station a railway hub and requiring the upgrading of the station in 1862 to provide separate tracks for the Werra Railway Company and the Royal Bavarian State Railways. The station gained new significance with the opening of the Franconian Forest Railway to Probstzella in October 1885, part of a new long-distance route to Berlin. The acquisition of the assets of the Werra Railway by the Prussian government in the 1890s was followed by an extensive expansion and restructuring of the railway facilities. The number of running tracks was increased to eleven, with 17 signalman's posts replaced by four signal boxes. Lichtenfels’ station area covered about 30 hectares and the railways employed about 29 percent of the city's workforce in 1914. The Coburger Tor was demolished in 1889. In 1896 the Coburger Straße pedestrian bridge was built over the railway tracks; it was demolished in 1934.

From 1934 to 1936 extensive works were carried out in preparation for the electrification of the line, including the building of a pedestrian underpass to the platforms, a road underpass for Coburger Straße, the raising of the level of the tracks and the installation of modern signal boxes and interlockings. Electric train operations were included in schedules from 15 May 1939.

During the Second World War, the depot was destroyed in an air raid on 23 February 1945. The German army demolished the switches and water cranes on 11 April 1945. 95 percent of the damage had been repaired by the end of 1945.

In the autumn of 1983 a new central interlocking was commissioned to the design of Lorenz. At the beginning of the 21st century this was followed by a further reorganisation of the station. The platforms were redesigned and they received a new roof, lifts, and 76 cm high platforms.

Passenger services

Long-distance
In Long-distance traffic ICE services on line 28, Hamburg–Berlin–Leipzig–Jena–Nürnberg–Munich, stopped every two hours until December 9, 2017.

With the start of the Ebensfeld–Erfurt high-speed railway in December 2017, it lost its status as a station for long-distance trains. The new line runs a few kilometres to the west of Lichtenfels. Now, the closest regular ICE stop is Bamberg and Intercity trains (Karlsruhe–Leipzig) serve Lichtenfels once a day each way.

Lichtenfels is served by the current long-distance services (2019):

According to a traffic modelling on behalf of the Coburg Chamber of Commerce in 2014, the station would handle 520 ICE passengers daily, 170 of those changing trains and 340 starting or finishing their journeys at the station.

Regional services

In regional transport, Lichtenfels is a hub with hourly connections to Upper Franconia and South Thuringia. The station is the start or end point for Regionalbahn connections and a through station for an agilis connection and three Regional-Express services:

Since December 2013, the regional express service, Würzburg–Bamberg–Lichtenfels–Bayreuth/Hof, has been divided into two lines. DB Regio Franken won the tender for services from 2015 in the Main-Spessart region and now operates to Bamberg, some services extended to Frankfurt via Würzburg. The Bamberg– Lichtenfels–Bayreuth/Hof route continues to be operated by DB Regio Oberfranken.

Tracks 
The station has eleven through tracks, some without access to platforms. On its three island platforms lie platform tracks 1 and 2 (170 m long), 3 and 5 (370 m) and 6 and 7 (210 m). These are accessed by an underpass, connected by stairs and elevators. There is no longer a platform attached to the main building.

In the roundhouse of the old railway depot contains some locomotives of the Nuremberg Transport Museum.

Entrance building 

The entrance building was built in 1848 and 1849 to an 1847 design of the architect Gottfried Neureuther. It consisted of a three-story central building with four windows and on both sides it had three-storey wings. In 1859/60 the wings were extended. In 1862 the station building was completely reconstructed in a Renaissance Revival style. It was south of an additional building that was designed similar to the old central building and connected to it by a three-storey building. In 1886 a symmetrical reception building was added. The station building is now listed as a monument by the Bavarian government.

Notes

References

External links 

Railway stations in Bavaria
Railway stations in Germany opened in 1846
1846 establishments in Bavaria
Buildings and structures in Lichtenfels, Bavaria